Reginald Everitt Lambert (25 September 1882 – 23 January 1968) was an English cricketer. Lambert's batting style is unknown, though it is known he bowled right-arm medium pace. He was born at Talham Court, Battle, Sussex, and was educated at Harrow School.

While studying at the University of Cambridge, Lambert made two first-class appearances for Cambridge University Cricket Club, one in 1903 against Yorkshire and another against Worcestershire in 1904. Lambert made two further first-class appearances in 1904 for different teams, making an appearance for Sussex against Cambridge University at Hove, and for the Marylebone Cricket Club against London County Cricket Club at Crystal Palace. In his four first-class matches, he scored a total of 72 runs at an average of 12.00, with a high score of 30. With the ball, he took 3 wickets at a bowling average of 54.66, with best figures of 3/53.

He died at Shaftesbury, Dorset, on 23 January 1968.

References

External links
Reginald Lambert at ESPNcricinfo
Reginald Lambert at CricketArchive

1882 births
1968 deaths
People from Battle, East Sussex
People educated at Harrow School
Alumni of the University of Cambridge
English cricketers
Cambridge University cricketers
Sussex cricketers
Marylebone Cricket Club cricketers